Physics Correspondence Seminar (FKS) is a correspondence competition primarily aimed at high school students in Slovakia. Its purpose is to provide an outlet for talented individuals by creating challenging problems and organising academic camps. The seminar organisers are mostly undergraduate students from the FMFI, Comenius University, Slovakia and other distinguished universities, such as Cambridge University. FKS is part of Trojsten, an NGO supporting educational activities in Slovakia in the field of mathematics, physics and computer science.

The purpose of the FKS is, firstly, to motivate high school students to become proficient in physics and problem solving in general; secondly, to prepare some of the students for international competitions such as the International Physics Olympiad, International Young Physicists' Tournament); and thirdly, to support them in preparing for studies at world's top universities, such as Oxford University, Cambridge University or Ivy League colleges. The alumni are well-positioned to become university researchers or engineers at prominent IT companies.

History 
The roots of FKS date back to 1985, when Ján Pišút, a university professor inspired by emerging mathematical correspondence seminars throughout Slovakia and Central Europe, founded a similar competition for physics enthusiasts. FKS, as well as other correspondence seminars, were created in the 1980s in order to provide high-school students an informal way of teaching STEM subjects by professors and students at FMFI UK. From the start FKS was organized primarily by professors at FMFI UK, but gradually the students took over. In its 30-year history, the seminar has raised a fair number of young physicists, who have studied or worked at the best universities in Slovakia and the world.

From a pedagogical point of view, FKS was influenced by the work of Milan Hejny, a Slovak mathematician who developed several novel methods of teaching mathematics, which have been applied in Czech Republic, Poland, Slovakia and other countries. Nowadays, Prof. Hejny works as a professor at the Faculty of Education at Charles University in Prague.

The main, correspondence part 
The correspondence competition runs during the whole school year and is divided in two parts: winter and summer, each consisting of three problem sets. They are two categories: B-category (for younger students) and A-category (for older students).

The aim of FKS problems is to be more than just textbook exercises; successful solutions require creativity and an original approach. Participants are expected to factually support their conclusions, construct well-argued numerical estimations, design and perform experiments or write computational simulations.

The participants send their solutions either via traditional mail or electronically via a submission system or email. The organizers grade their solutions and send them back together with model answers and feedback. There is strong emphasis on pointing out flaws or imperfections in reasoning or, on the other hand, highlighting the positive aspects of the solution. Consequently, at the end of each semester, the 36 best participants are invited to attend week-long winter and summer camps.

Other activities of the FKS

Summer and winter camps 
As a reward, the best seminar participants are invited to take part in winter or summer camps. The these camps are typically one week long and are located in the countryside of Slovakia. A typical day at the camp consists of lectures on advanced topics from the university undergraduates in the morning and an adventure program in the afternoon and evening.

UFO 
Apart from the seminar for high school students, there is UFO, a primary school version for students up to 15 years of age launched in 2008. Its structure and organization are similar to the main seminar, enabling synergies in organisation. To strengthen the community ties, the high schools students that participate in the main seminar often help organising UFO.

FX 
FX is a special category designed for most passionate students, who aspire to become professional researchers. The problems often involve advanced mathematical methods, such as differentiation or integration, and concepts from undergraduate physics curricula, and require intense self-study prior to submission. The participants can send their solutions several times; after each trial they get feedback from the authors of the problems. This iterative system enables every participant to improve at their own pace. FX was launched in 2005.

The participants are annually invited to the FX Spring School, an intense week-long camp. Compared with other FKS camps, this camp is academically more demanding, as the lectures constitute the major part of the programme. The emphasis is on developing independent thinking and problem solving skills easily transferable to university research. Participants of the FX Spring School are typically the students representing Slovakia at international competitions and scoring medals.

FKS Summer School 
The FKS Summer School is a two-week summer camp organised at FMFI, Comenius University, Slovakia. The aim of FKS Summer School is primarily to broaden the physics knowledge of a large number of motivated students, not necessarily the participants of the correspondence seminars, and thus increasing the competition in physics competitions in Slovakia like Physics Olympiad or Young Physicist's Tournament. Secondary, to create a place when students can meet real physicists and popularize the science. There is also emphasis on development of soft-skills.

Physics Náboj 
Physics Náboj (Bullet) is a team competition for high school students held each year in November. Teams representing high schools consisting of up to five students compete in a time limit of about 90 minutes in solving as many problems as possible. Each team starts with eight problems; after the successful submission of a problem they receive a new one to solve. Approximately 400 students are annually involved in this competition. There is also a mathematical version of this competition.

The idea of organising a nationwide competition for high school teams arose from games played at FKS summer/winter camps called "NÁstenkový BOJ", literally "a notice-board fight". (After successful solution of a problem, a new one appeared on a large notice-board.) The first Physics Náboj was held in 1998.

In 2015, Náboj was organized internationally for the first time  (alongside Bratislava in Prague and Budapest) with the help of local educational organizations. The future plans are to increase this unique international collaboration by expanding to other countries in the region.

The Trojsten Academy and Club
Trojsten Academy serves as a one-day event of Trojsten annually organized in December, where university professors and prominent scientists deliver lectures on quantum mechanics, quantum information, condensed matter, etc.

Trojsten Club is a one-day companion event to the Academy, Mathematics Náboj and Physics Náboj. During Trojsten Club, organizers of correspondence seminars give popular lectures and organize city adventure games or other activites for high-school students.

External links 
  Official webpage of Physics Correspondence Seminar
  Faculty of Mathematics, Physics and Informatics, Comenius University, Bratislava

References 

Physics competitions
Science events in Slovakia